Monika Niederstätter (born 2 March 1974 in Merano, Italy) is a former 400 m hurdler (near the end of her career she switched to 400 metres), that won four medals at the International athletics competitions.

Biography
Her best achievement is a fourth place at the 2002 European Athletics Championships. Her personal best time of 55.10s was set on 22 August 1999 at the World Championships in Seville, Spain.

Achievements

National titles
Monika Niederstätter has won 8 times consecutively the individual national championship.
6 wins in 400 metres hurdles (1998, 1999, 2000, 2001, 2002, 2003)
2 wins in 400 metres indoor (2004, 2005)

See also
 Italian all-time top lists - 400 metres hurdles

References

External links
 

1974 births
Living people
Sportspeople from Merano
Italian female hurdlers
Italian female sprinters
Olympic athletes of Italy
Athletes (track and field) at the 2000 Summer Olympics
Athletes (track and field) at the 2004 Summer Olympics
World Athletics Championships athletes for Italy
Mediterranean Games silver medalists for Italy
Mediterranean Games bronze medalists for Italy
Athletes (track and field) at the 2001 Mediterranean Games
Athletes (track and field) at the 2005 Mediterranean Games
Mediterranean Games medalists in athletics